To Bonnie from Delaney is the fourth album by Delaney & Bonnie and Friends. It was their first studio album for the Atco/Atlantic label (catalog no. SD 33-341), and their fourth album overall. Coincidentally, Atco/Atlantic's parent company purchased the Bramletts' previous label Elektra Records around this time.

The album peaked at #58 on the Billboard album chart in October 1970, with a single from the album released around that same time, "Soul Shake", also charting. Several of the album's songs ("Living on the Open Road", "The Love of My Man", "Alone Together" and "Going Down the Road Feeling Bad") became staples of Delaney and Bonnie's live shows and remained so until their breakup in 1972.

"Friends" on the album includes Duane Allman, Little Richard, King Curtis and Sneaky Pete Kleinow.

Track listing
"Hard Luck and Troubles" (Delaney Bramlett) – 2:35
"God Knows I Love You" (Delaney Bramlett, Mac Davis) – 2:46
"Lay Down My Burden" (Steve Bogard, Michael Utley) – 3:35
Medley: "Come On In My Kitchen" (Robert Johnson)/"Mama, He Treats Your Daughter Mean" (Herbert Lance, Johnny Wallace)/"Goin' Down the Road Feelin' Bad" (Traditional; arranged by Delaney Bramlett) – 4:10
"The Love of My Man" (Ed Townsend) – 4:28
"They Call It Rock and Roll Music" (Delaney Bramlett) – 3:33
"Soul Shake" (Margaret Lewis, Myrna Smith) – 3:10
"Miss Ann" (Richard Penniman, Enotris Johnson) – 5:01
"Alone Together" (Delaney Bramlett, Bonnie Bramlett, Bobby Whitlock) – 3:13
"Living on the Open Road" (Delaney Bramlett) – 3:02
"Let Me Be Your Man" (George Soulé, Terry Woodford) – 3:20
"Free the People" (Barbara Keith) – 2:47

Personnel
Delaney Bramlett – guitar, vocals
Bonnie Bramlett – vocals
Duane Allman – guitar
Mike Utley – piano
Jim Gordon – keyboards
Sneaky Pete Kleinow – steel guitar
Little Richard – piano
Jim Dickinson – piano
Charlie Freeman – guitar
Ben Benay – guitar
Kenny Gradney – bass guitar
Bobby Whitlock – piano
Ron Tutt – drums
Sammy Creason – drums
Jerry Jumonville – alto saxophone
King Curtis – tenor saxophone
Darrell Leonard – trumpet, trombone
Sam Clayton – congas
Wayne Jackson – trumpet
Jack Hale – trombone, trumpet
Alan Estes – conga, percussion
Jerry Scheff – bass guitar
Tommy McClure – bass guitar
Ed Logan – tenor saxophone
Andrew Love – saxophone
Frank Mayes – tenor saxophone
Floyd Newman – baritone saxophone

Production
Producer: Tom Dowd
Recording engineer: Tom Dowd, Ron Albert, Chuck Kirkpatrick, Don Casale
Art direction: n/a
Photography: Tom Wilkes, Barry Feinstein
Liner notes: n/a

References 

Delaney & Bonnie albums
1970 albums
Albums produced by Tom Dowd
Albums produced by Jerry Wexler
Albums produced by Delaney Bramlett
Atco Records albums
Country rock albums by American artists